Antisthenes of Rhodes was an ancient Greek historian who lived  200 BCE. He took an active part in the political affairs of his country, and wrote a history of his own time, which, notwithstanding his bias towards his native island of Rhodes, is spoken of in terms of high praise by Polybius. He wrote an account of the Battle of Lade (201 BCE) and was, according to Polybius, a contemporary with the events he described.

It is likely that this Antisthenes is the historian who wrote a Successions of the Greek philosophers, which is often referred to by Diogenes Laërtius. He might also be the Peripatetic philosopher cited by Phlegon of Tralles.

Plutarch mentions an Antisthenes who wrote a work called Meleagris, of which the third book is quoted; and Pliny the Elder speaks of an Antisthenes who wrote on the pyramids.

Notes

3rd-century BC births
2nd-century BC deaths
3rd-century BC Rhodians
2nd-century BC Rhodians
Ancient Greek biographers
Hellenistic-era historians
2nd-century BC historians
Ancient Rhodian historians